Dolná Mariková is a village and municipality in Považská Bystrica District in the Trenčín Region of north-western Slovakia.

History
In historical records the village was first mentioned in 1321.

Geography
The municipality lies at an altitude of 343 metres and covers an area of 22.129 km2. It has a population of about 1460 people.

Genealogical resources

The records for genealogical research are available at the state archive "Statny Archiv in Bytca, Slovakia"

 Roman Catholic church records (births/marriages/deaths): 1711-1895 (parish A)

See also
 List of municipalities and towns in Slovakia

References

External links

 
https://web.archive.org/web/20080111223415/http://www.statistics.sk/mosmis/eng/run.html
Surnames of living people in Dolna Marikova

Villages and municipalities in Považská Bystrica District